William Henry Furman (born 1942) is an American convicted felon who was the central figure in Furman v. Georgia (1972), the case in which the United States Supreme Court outlawed most uses of the death penalty in the United States.

Background 
Furman, a black man, had a sixth-grade education, and was judged "emotionally disturbed and mentally impaired."

Crime and legal history 

Furman was convicted of murdering William Micke during a home invasion in Savannah, Georgia on August 11, 1967, and subsequently sentenced to death on September 26, 1968, after a one-day trial.

The sentence was overturned by the Supreme Court on the basis of the Eighth and Fourteenth Amendments. The decision struck down death penalty schemes in the whole country. Four years after the landmark decision, the Supreme Court reaffirmed the constitutionality of the death penalty when it approved the statutory changes made by three states in Gregg v. Georgia (1976).

Furman was paroled in April 1984.

In 2004, Furman pleaded guilty to a 2004 burglary charge in Bibb County Superior Court, and was sentenced to 20 years in prison. He was paroled twelve years later, in April 2016.

External links
Suspended sentence: How the U.S. almost put capital punishment to death by Kevin Clarke

Notes 

1942 births
Living people
American people convicted of murder
American prisoners sentenced to death
American burglars
People paroled from life sentence
People convicted of murder by Georgia (U.S. state)
Prisoners sentenced to death by Georgia (U.S. state)